Viswadarshanam is a 2019 Indian Telugu-language biopic written and directed by Janardhana Maharshi. The film is produced by T. G. Vishwa Prasad and Vivek Kuchibotla, under People Media Factory. It stars K. Viswanath and Raadhika.

The film is scored by Swaraveenapani with cinematography by Sajeesh Rajendran, and editing by Shyam Vadavalli. Principal photography of the film began on 2019 in Hyderabad. The film's initial release date of April 2020 has been deferred due to the COVID-19 pandemic. The film is now scheduled to release in April 2021.

The film was aired on ETV (Telugu) on February 19, marking K. Viswanath's Jayanti.

Cast 
 K. Viswanath
 Tanikella Bharani
 Raadhika
 Sirivennela Seetharama Sastry
 Bhanupriya
 Aamani

Festivals 
 South Asian International Film Festival (2019)

References

External links 
 

2019 films
2010s Telugu-language films
Films shot in Hyderabad, India
Films set in Andhra Pradesh
Films set in Telangana
Films set in Chennai
Films postponed due to the COVID-19 pandemic